Dragomir R. Radev is a Yale University professor of computer science working on natural language processing and information retrieval. He previously served as a University of Michigan computer science professor and Columbia University computer science adjunct professor. Radev serves as Member of the Advisory Board of Lawyaw.

He is currently working in the fields of open domain question answering,  multi-document summarization, and the application of NLP in Bioinformatics, Social Network Analysis and Political Science.

Radev received his PhD in Computer Science from Columbia University in 1999.

Awards 
As NACLO founder, Radev shared the Linguistic Society of America 2011 Linguistics, Language and the Public Award. He is the  Co-winner of the Gosnell Prize (2006).

In 2015 he was named a fellow of the Association for Computing Machinery "for contributions to natural language processing and computational linguistics."

In 2022, Dragomir Radev receives the 2022 ACL Distinguished Service Award.

IOL
Radev has served as the coach and led the US national team in the International Linguistics Olympiad (IOL) to several gold medals .

Books 
 Puzzles in Logic, Languages and Computation (2013) 
 Mihalcea and Radev (2011) Graph-based methods for NLP and IR

Selected Papers 
 SIGIR 1995 Generating summaries of multiple news articles
 ANLP 1997 Building a generation knowledge source using internet-accessible newswire
 Computational Linguistics 1998 Generating natural language summaries from multiple on-line sources
 ACL 1998 Learning correlations between linguistic indicators and semantic constraints: Reuse of context dependent descriptions of entities
 ANLP 2000 Ranking suspected answers to natural language questions using predictive annotation
 CIKM 2001 Mining the web for answers to natural language questions
 AAAI 2002 Towards CST-enhanced summarization
 ACL 2003 Evaluation challenges in large-scale multi-document summarization: the Mead project
 Information Processing and Management 2004 Centroid-based summarization of multiple documents
 Journal of Artificial Intelligence Research 2004 LexRank: Graph-based lexical centrality as salience in text summarization
 Journal of the American Association of Information Science and Technology 2005 Probabilistic question answering on the web
 Communications of the ACM 2005 NewsInEssence: summarizing online news topics
 EMNLP 2007 Semi-supervised classification for extracting protein interaction sentences using dependency parsing
 Bioinformatics 2008 Identifying gene-disease associations using centrality on a literature mined gene-interaction network
 IEEE Intelligent Systems 2008 natural language processing and the web
 NAACL 2009 Generating surveys of scientific paradigms
 Nucleic Acids Research 2009 Michigan molecular interactions r2: from interacting proteins to pathways
 Journal of the American Association of Information Science and Technology 2009 Visual overviews for discovering key papers and influences across research fronts
 KDD 2010 Divrank: the interplay of prestige and diversity in information networks
 American Journal of Political Science 2010 How to Analyze Political Attention with Minimal Assumptions and Costs
 Arxiv 2011 The effect of linguistic constraints on the large scale organization of language
 Journal of Biomedical Semantics 2011 Mining of vaccine-associated ifn-gamma gene interaction networks using the vaccine ontology

External links
 Team USA Brings Home the Linguistics Gold
 Dragomir Radev, Co-Founders Recognized as NACLO Receives Linguistics, Language and the Public Award
 Dragomir Radev Coaches US Linguistics Team to Multiple Wins
 Dragomir Radev Honored as ACM Distinguished Scientist
 Prof. Dragomir Radev Receives Gosnell Prize

References 

Year of birth missing (living people)
Living people
Columbia School of Engineering and Applied Science alumni
American computer scientists
University of Michigan faculty
Natural language processing
Information retrieval researchers
Fellows of the Association for Computing Machinery
Fellows of the Association for the Advancement of Artificial Intelligence
Natural language processing researchers
Data miners